Ambalang Ausalin (March 4, 1943 – February 18, 2022) was a Filipino master weaver from the city of Lamitan, Basilan.

Biography
Ambalang was renowned for her mastery of the crafts of sinaluan and sputangan, two of the most intricately designed textiles of the indigenous Yakan community. She learned weaving through her mother, who was previously reputed to be the best weaver in Basilan and first practiced the craft by using coconut strips.

Ausalin was given the National Living Treasure Award by the Philippines through the National Commission for Culture and the Arts in 2016. She died at her home in Parangbasak, Lamitan, on February 18, 2022, at the age of 78.

References 

1943 births
2022 deaths
20th-century Filipino artists
21st-century Filipino artists
Filipino weavers
People from Basilan
National Living Treasures of the Philippines